Diego Díaz may refer to:

 Diego Diaz, character in the American TV series Kingdom
 Diego Díaz (Spanish footballer) (born 1968), Spanish former football goalkeeper
 Diego Díaz Ahumada (born 1986), Chilean former football defender
 Diego Díaz García (born 1988), Chilean football defender
 Diego Díaz Núñez (born 1996), Chilean football midfielder
 Diego Valentín Díaz (died 1660), Spanish painter